This is a list of German television related events from 1961.

Events
25 February - Lale Andersen is selected to represent Germany at the 1961 Eurovision Song Contest with her song "Einmal sehen wir uns wieder". She is selected to be the sixth German Eurovision entry during Die Schlagerparade held at the Kurhus in Bad Homburg vor der Höhe.

Debuts

ARD
 10 January – Funkstreife Isar 12 (1961–1963)
 24 January – Adieu, Prinzessin (1961)
 27 February – Zu viele Köche (1961)
 12 March – Hotel Victoria (1961–1968)
 26 March – Das Fernsehgericht tagt (1961–1978)
 13 May – Heinz Erhardt Festival (1961–1963)
 18 May – Zeit der Schuldlosen (1961)
 26 May – Inspector Hornleigh Intervenes (1961)
 13 June – Die merkwürdigen Erlebnisse des Hansjürgen Weidlich (1961–1963)
 22 September – Die Rückblende (1961–1963)
 4 October – Gestatten, mein Name ist Cox (1961–1965)
 22 October – Musik aus Studio B (1961–1976)
 8 December – Komische Geschichten mit Georg Thomalla (1961–1971)
 Unknown – Unternehmen Kummerkasten (1961–1962)

DFF
 24 October –  Geheime Front durchbrochen (1961–1962)

International
20 March –  The Huckleberry Hound Show (1958–1961) (Das Erste)

Television shows

1950s
Tagesschau (1952–present)

Ending this year

Births

Deaths